A Tipperary County Council election was held in County Tipperary in Ireland on 24 May 2019 as part of that year's local elections. All 40 councillors were elected for a five-year term of office from 8 local electoral areas (LEAs) by single transferable vote.

The 2018 LEA boundary review committee significantly altered the LEAs used in the 2014 elections. Its terms of reference required no change in the total number of councillors but set a lower maximum LEA size of seven councillors, exceeded by three of the five 2014 LEAs. Other changes were necessitated by population shifts revealed by the 2016 census. The changes were enacted by statutory instrument (S.I.) No. 634/2018, and amended by S.I. No. 156/2019.

Results by party

Results by local electoral area

Cahir

Carrick-on-Suir

Cashel–Tipperary

Clonmel

Nenagh

Newport

Roscrea–Templemore

Thurles

Results by gender

Changes since election
† Clonmel Fine Gael Cllr Garret Ahearn was elected to Seanad Éireann at the 2020 Seanad election, on the Administrative Panel. On 13 July 2020, John Fitzgerald was co-opted to fill the vacancy, having been selected by a postal ballot of Fine Gael members in four branches: Clonmel, Kilsheelan/Ballypatrick, Clerihan and Powerstown.

Footnotes

Sources

References

2019 Irish local elections
2019